Libya (Great Socialist People's Libyan Arab Jamahiriya) competed at the 1996 Summer Olympics in Atlanta, United States.

Results by event

Athletics

Men 

Track and road events

Cycling

Road 

Men

See also
 Libya at the 1996 Summer Paralympics

References
Official Olympic Reports

Nations at the 1996 Summer Olympics
1996
Olympics